Trần Mạnh Dũng (born 9 March 1990) is a Vietnamese footballer who last played as an attacking midfielder, striker for Nam Định. He was also a member of the Vietnam national football team.

Match-fixing scandal
During the 2014 V.League 1 season, Vissai Ninh Bình wrote to the Vietnam Football Federation (VFF) and to the Vietnam Professional Football Joint Stock Company to withdraw from the league due to 13 players being involved in match fixing. On August 25 of the year, Trần found guilty of the charge and was sentenced to 30 months in prison for being the groups ring-leader. In December, the VFF banned Trần for life from playing football in the country.

References 

1990 births
Living people
Vietnamese footballers
Association football midfielders
V.League 1 players
Vietnam international footballers
Southeast Asian Games silver medalists for Vietnam
Southeast Asian Games medalists in football
Competitors at the 2009 Southeast Asian Games
Vissai Ninh Bình FC players
Nam Định F.C. players